Shuchi is a given name, used as a female name in India and China and as a male name in Japan. It is the name of:

Shuchi Chawla, US-based Indian computer scientist
Shuchi Grover, educator
Shuchi Kothari, New Zealand-based Indian scriptwriter and producer
Shuchi Kubouchi (1920–2020), Japanese professional Go player

Shuchi Thakur, Indian professional rally driver
Yuan Shu-chi (born 1984), Chinese archer

See also
The Bookworm (short story), originally titled "Shuchi"